Wendy Davis (born June 30, 1966) is an American actress. She is best known for her role as Colonel Joan Burton in the Lifetime television drama series Army Wives (2007–2013), for which she received three NAACP Image Award for Outstanding Actress in a Drama Series nominations.

Early life
Davis grew up in Joppatowne, Maryland. She attended Joppatowne High School and graduated with a degree in Theater from Howard University. Davis is a member of Delta Sigma Theta sorority.

Career
Davis began her career appearing in television sitcoms. She was semi-regular on the 1991 sitcom The New WKRP in Cincinnati as receptionist Ronnie Lee, and guest starred on Martin, The Sinbad Show , and Coach. From 1996 to 1997, Davis starred as Lynette White in the ABC police drama High Incident created by Steven Spielberg. The series ran two seasons. The following years, she spent appearing in the television and independent films, including Return to Two Moon Junction (1995), and well as guest starred on episodes of Any Day Now, Angel, Cold Case, and Grey's Anatomy.

In 2007, Davis was cast as Colonel Joan Burton in the Lifetime television drama series Army Wives opposite Kim Delaney, Catherine Bell, Sally Pressman and Brigid Brannagh. Davis has also received three NAACP Image Award nominations for her role under the category of "Outstanding Actress in a Drama Series" in 2008, 2009, and 2011. She starred in show from 2007 to 2013, leaving after the season 7 finale. Lifetime later canceled the series after seven seasons.

From 2012 to 2013, Davis had a recurring role as Kimberly Mitchell in the second season of ABC drama series Scandal created by Shonda Rhimes. She later guest starred on Castle, Criminal Minds, NCIS, and Major Crimes. In 2018, she was cast in a series regular role in the Oprah Winfrey Network comedy-drama series Love Is created and produced by Mara Brock Akil and Salim Akil. The series was canceled after one season due to allegations of domestic violence and lifting the idea for the series from an ex-lover against Salim Akil.

Personal life
Davis has a daughter with ex-husband Jacobi Wynne. She and her daughter live in Los Angeles CA.    In a series of 9 short videos available through the "Understood" website and through YouTube, she discusses growing up with ADHD, how it helped her as an actress, and how she responded to her daughter getting the same diagnosis. The videos are to help parents of children with ADHD, adults with ADHD, and the rest of the population.

Filmography

Film

Television

Awards and nominations
Drama-Logue Award – Talking With
2008, Image Awards – Outstanding Actress in a Drama Series Army Wives (Nominated)
2009, Image Awards – Outstanding Actress in a Drama Series Army Wives (Nominated)
2011, Image Awards – Outstanding Actress in a Drama Series Army Wives (Nominated)
2008, Prism Awards – Performance in a Drama Series Multi-Episode Storyline Army Wives (Nominated)

References

External links

Living people
African-American actresses
American film actresses
American television actresses
Howard University alumni
People from Joppatowne, Maryland
1966 births
Actresses from Maryland
20th-century American actresses
21st-century American actresses
Delta Sigma Theta members